George Francis Austin (October 9, 1877 – May 13, 1954) was an American film actor. He appeared in more than 120 films between 1917 and 1950. He died in Los Angeles on May 13, 1954, at age 76.

Selected filmography

 The Secret of Black Mountain (1917)
 The Circus Cyclone (1925)
 The Desert Demon (1925)
 The Monster (1925 film) (1925)
 Snowed In (1926)
 Code of the Northwest (1926)
 Sweet Adeline (1926)
 The Terror (1928)
 The Desert Bride (1928)
 Court Martial (1928)
 The Drifter (1929)
 The Laurel-Hardy Murder Case (1930)
  Bad Girl (1931)
 The Range Feud (1931)
 Another Wild Idea (1934)
 Babes in Toyland (1934)
 Young Dynamite (1937)
 The Harvey Girls (1944)
 Jiggs and Maggie in Court (1948)

References

External links

1877 births
1954 deaths
20th-century American male actors
American male film actors
Male actors from Missouri
People from Mound City, Missouri